Kay Khusraw was the Baduspanid ruler (ustandar) of Rustamdar from 1301/2 to 1312/3. He was the brother and successor of Namawar Shah Ghazi. 

Reportedly the father of almost 100 children, he was succeeded by his son Shams al-Muluk Muhammad after his death in 1312/3.

References

Sources 
 

14th-century Baduspanid rulers
1310s deaths
Year of birth unknown
Year of death uncertain